Bürgstadt is a market community in the Miltenberg district in the Regierungsbezirk of Lower Franconia (Unterfranken) in Bavaria, Germany and the seat of the Verwaltungsgemeinschaft (Administrative Community) of Erftal. Bürgstadt is a winegrowing community in the wine region of Franken. It has a population of around 4,300.

Geography

Location 
Bürgstadt lies at the mouth of the river Erf where it empties into the Main and has grown together with the district seat of Miltenberg lying to the southwest. It lies at the northeast edge of the Odenwald hill, on the boundary with Baden-Württemberg.

History 

The Bürgstadter Berg (hill) (see ) was inhabited as early as 3,200 BC by members of the Michelsberg culture. During the Urnfield period (ca. 1200 to 800 BC) a fortified settlement protected by a circular rampart was constructed on the hill. The ramparts stretched for a total length of 3.2 km, surrounding an area of ca. 40 hectares. Excavations found remains of a gate from around 900 BC.

The Roman castrum Miltenberg-Ost was partly located within Bürgstadt's municipal area.

There likely was a royal estate here as early as the 7th century.

In 1181, Bürgstadt had its first documentary mention. Bürgstadt passed into Electoral Mainz's hands quite early on, presumably by the 8th century, and remained a Mainz holding until the Old Empire came to an end in 1803.

Until the 18th century, Bürgstadt was the seat of a Centgraf (tithe count), but had already lost much of its importance by the late Middle Ages to neighbouring Miltenberg, also a property of Mainz, which had a more favourable strategic location and was protected by a castle.

Economy

In the past furniture making, the growing of tobacco and (for centuries) quarrying all played a role in the local economy.

Winegrowing, which is still important in Bürgstadt today, was first mentioned in a document in 1248. With just under 60 ha of vineyards, the community is one of the biggest winegrowing communities on the Lower Main. In 1612, red wine from Bürgstadt had its first historical mention.

On the Bürgstadter Centgrafenberg, red wine is grown, which for Bürgstadt holds great importance. Mainly Pinot noir and Pinot noir précoce are grown in the vineyards there in bunter soil. Almost all the community’s winegrowing businesses take it in fortnightly turns to offer up their own wine with various kinds of bread in Häckerwirtschaften.

Arts and culture

Museums 
The museum in the former Bürgstadt Mittelmühle ("Middle Mill") is divided along main thematic lines of winegrowing in Bürgstadt and sandstone quarrying and processing. Documented here as well are tobacco growing, early and local history and the life and times of the composer Johann Michael Breunig (1699–1755), who was born here. Since 2002, a Roman department has been showing the local early history. The history of ethnic Germans driven out of their lands after the Second World War has a special room dedicated to it. Special exhibitions on current themes in local and club history and on everyday village life before 1960 are presented, changing twice yearly, with the help of the museum's inventory.

Notable buildings 
The  is a chapel originally erected about 950 and rebuilt on the earlier foundations ca. 1200, with its mural Bible paintings presented in 40 medallions (ca. 1590). It also features Gothic doors (ca. 1490) and a Baroque altar (ca. 1600). The late Romanesque old parish church (built about 1350) was until 1522 the mother church of Miltenberg. There are also the historic town hall (built about 1590-2) and the ruins of the Centgrafenkapelle ("Tithe Counts’ Chapel") from the 17th century on a nearby hill. Work on the latter ceased during the Thirty Years' War leaving the unfinished building a ruin. The modern Catholic parish church dates from 1961.

In May 2000, the Mittelmühle, which had been converted into a civic centre, was opened to the public.

Regular events 
About Ascension Day each year, the Winemakers’ Festival is held. Every five years, a Carnival (locally, Fasching) parade is staged with the Altweibermühle (“Old Women’s Mill”; its first documentary mention goes back to 1860) as the highlight. Every year on the first weekend in July, the local football club stages its tournament for the Centgrafen-Cup (“Tithe Counts’ Cup”), its name coming from the community’s history. On the second weekend in July, the street and farm festival is held, in which many local clubs take part.

Sports
Bürgstadt has at its disposal a heated swimming pool and sporting grounds, tennis courts, a tennis hall with squash courts and further sporting grounds. Both ways along the Main valley run expanded cycle paths. Moreover, there are many hiking paths along the Main and the Erf, through the vineyards and in the woods.

Since 1990, Bürgstadt has lain on the Fränkischer Rotwein Wanderweg ("Franconian Red Wine Hiking Trail").

Government

Community council 

The council is made up of 17 council members, counting the mayor.

(as at municipal election held on 2 March 2008)

Coat of arms 
The community’s arms might be described thus: On a base vert gules a castle embattled argent with two round side towers likewise embattled and with door and windows open, in chief between the towers a wheel spoked of six of the last.

Despite the market community’s importance, neither an old seal nor anything else like a coat of arms is known. The first evidence of such a thing came with the Mayor’s Medallion from about 1820 with the composition as it is known today. The wheel – the Wheel of Mainz – and the tinctures argent and gules (silver and red) refer to the former ownership by the Electoral state of Mainz. The castle is a canting charge for the community’s name (Burg – without the umlaut mark – means “castle” in German; Stadt means “town”, although it has never officially been one).

The arms have been borne since the 19th century.

Notable people 
 Ernst Heinrichsohn, mayor from 1978 to 1980, sentenced in 1980 in Cologne to six years in prison for having taken part in persecuting Jews in occupied France during the Second World War (see: Vel' d'Hiv Roundup)

Sons and daughters of the town 
  (Baroque composer)
  (actress, screenplay writer, producer)

Further reading 
 Wolfgang Meister: Die Martinskapelle in Bürgstadt. Zeugnis von Kunstsinn und Glaubenseifer einer Landgemeinde um 1600, Bürgstadt 2004

References

External links 

 Town’s official webpage 
 Lower Main history portal 

Miltenberg (district)